Kingfisher Creek Provincial Park is a provincial park in British Columbia, Canada located 15 km southeast of Sicamous and west of Mabel Lake in the Monashee Mountains.  The park is 440 hectares and was created to enhance the viability of the Kingfisher Creek Ecological Preserve.

References
BC Parks infopage

Monashee Mountains
Provincial parks of British Columbia
Year of establishment missing